Electronic voting is the standard means of conducting elections using Electronic Voting Machines (EVMs) in India. The system was developed and tested by the state-owned Electronics Corporation of India and Bharat Electronics in the 1990s. They were introduced in Indian elections between 1998 and 2001, in a phased manner. Prior to the introduction of electronic voting, India used paper ballots and manual counting. The paper ballots method was widely criticised because of fraudulent voting and booth capturing, where party loyalists captured booths and stuffed them with pre-filled fake ballots. The printed paper ballots were also more expensive, requiring substantial post-voting resources to count hundreds of millions of individual ballots. Embedded EVM features such as "electronically limiting the rate of casting votes to five per minute", a security "lock-close" feature, an electronic database of "voting signatures and thumb impressions" to confirm the identity of the voter, conducting elections in phases over several weeks while deploying extensive security personnel at each booth have helped reduce electoral fraud and abuse, eliminate booth capturing and create more competitive and fairer elections. Indian EVMs are stand-alone machines built with once write, read-only memory. The EVMs are produced with secure manufacturing practices, and by design, are self-contained, battery-powered and lack any networking capability. They do not have any wireless or wired internet components and interface. The M3 version of the EVMs includes the VVPAT system.

In recent elections, various opposition parties have alleged faulty EVMs after they failed to defeat the incumbent. After rulings of Delhi High Court, the Supreme Court of India in 2011 directed the Election Commission to include a paper trail as well to help confirm the reliable operation of EVMs. The Election Commission developed EVMs with voter-verified paper audit trail (VVPAT) system between 2012 and 2013. The system was tried on a pilot basis in the 2014 Indian general election. EVMs and accompanying Voter-verified paper audit trail (VVPAT) are now used in every assembly and general election in India and a small percentage of the VVPATs are verified. On 9 April 2019, Supreme Court of India ordered the Election Commission of India to use VVPAT paper trail system in every assembly constituency but verify only about 2% of the EVMs i.e., 5 polling stations per constituency before certifying the final results. The Election Commission of India has acted under this order and deployed VVPAT verification for 20,625 EVMs in the 2019 Indian general election.

The Election Commission of India states that their machines, system checks, safeguard procedures, and election protocols are "fully tamper-proof". A team led by Vemuri Hari Prasad of NetIndia Private Limited has shown that if criminals get physical possession of the EVMs before the voting, they can change the hardware inside and thus manipulate the results. The Prasad team recommended a VVPAT paper trail system for verification. The Election Commission states that along with VVPAT method, immediately prior to the election day, a sample number of votes for each political party nominee is entered into each machine, in the presence of polling agents. At the end of this sample trial run, the votes counted and matched with the entered sample votes, to ensure that the machine's hardware has not been tampered with, it is operating reliably and that there were no hidden votes pre-recorded in each machine. Machines that yield a faulty result have been replaced to ensure a reliable electoral process.

History
India used paper ballots till the 1990s. The sheer scale of the Indian elections with more than half a billion people eligible to vote, combined with election-related criminal activity, led Indian election authority and high courts to transition to electronic voting. According to Arvind Verma – a professor of Criminal Justice with a focus on South Asia, Indian elections have been marked by criminal fraud and ballot tampering since the 1950s. The first major election with large scale organized booth capturing were observed in 1957. The journalist Prem Shankar Jha, states Milan Vaishnav, documented the booth capturing activity by Congress party leaders, and the opposition parties soon resorted to the same fraudulent activity in the 1960s. A booth-capture was the phenomenon where party loyalists, criminal gangs and musclemen entered the booth with force in villages and remote areas, and stuffed the ballot boxes with pre-filled fake paper ballots. This problem grew between the 1950s and 1980s and became a serious and large scale problem in states such as Uttar Pradesh and Bihar, later spreading to Andhra Pradesh, Jammu and Kashmir and West Bengal accompanied with election day violence. Another logistical problem was the printing of paper ballots, transporting and safely storing them, and physically counting hundreds of millions of votes.

The Election Commission of India, led by T.N. Seshan, sought a solution by developing Electronic voting machines in the 1990s. These devices were designed to prevent fraud by limiting how fast new votes can be entered into the electronic machine. By limiting the rate of vote entered every minute to five, the Commission aimed to increase the time required to cast fake ballots, therefore, allow the security forces to intervene in cooperation with the volunteers of the competing political parties and the media.

The Commission introduced other features such as EVM initialization procedures just before the elections. Officials tested each machine prior to the start of voting to confirm its reliable operation in the front of independent polling agents. They added a security lock “close” button which saved the votes already cast in the device's permanent memory but disabled the device's ability to accept additional votes in the case of any attempt to open the unit or tamper. The Commission decided to conduct the elections over several weeks in order to move and post a large number of security forces at each booth. On the day of voting, the ballots were also locked and then saved in a secure location under the watch of state security and local volunteer citizens. Additionally, the Election Commission also created a database of thumb impressions and electronic voting signatures, open to inspection by polling agent volunteers and outside observers. The EVMs-based system at each booth matches the voter with a registered card with this electronic database in order to ensure that a voter cannot cast a ballot more than once. According to Debnath and other scholars, these efforts of the Election Commission of India – developed in consultations with the Indian courts, experts and volunteer feedback from different political parties – have reduced electoral fraud in India and made the elections fairer and more competitive.

EVM and Indian judiciary
EVM and electronic voting have been the subject of numerous court cases in Indian courts including the Supreme Court of India. The first case was filed in the 1980s even before EVMs were used in any election. The AC Jose vs. Sivan Pillai case was a case seeking a stay order on the use of EVMs for Kerala election. The case was reviewed by the Supreme Court. It ruled on March 5, 1984, that the extant laws of India – in particular, Sections 59–61 of the Representation of People Act 1951 – specified paper ballots and it, therefore, forbade the use of any other technology including electronic voting. And it was used in 1982 in Kerala for a limited number of polling stations. The EVMs were first time used on an experimental basis in selected constituencies of Rajasthan, Madhya Pradesh, and Delhi. The Court stated that the use of an alternate technology would require the Indian parliament to amend the law.

The parliament of India amended the Representation of People Act in December 1988. Section 61A of the amended law empowered the Election Commission to deploy voting machines instead of paper ballots. The amended law became effective from March 15, 1989. The use of EVMs, their reliability and speculations about fraud through the use of EVMs have been the subject of many lawsuits before state high courts and the Supreme Court of India. These courts have either dismissed the cases as frivolous or ruled in the favor of the Election Commission and the EVMs. Of these, in the 2002 ruling on the J. Jayalalithaa and Ors vs. Election Commission of India case, the Supreme Court of India stated that the use of EVMs in elections was constitutionally valid.

Regarding the mismatch of EVM data, an election research organization Association for Democratic Reforms (ADR) filed a petition in the Supreme Court of India on 15 November 2019 asking for a court order directing the Election Commission of India to conduct actual and accurate reconciliation of (votes) data before the declaration of the final result of any election. ADR also made an appeal for an investigation into all discrepancies in the data related to the 2019 Lok Sabha election results.

Electronic voting
The Indian electronic voting machine (EVM) were developed in 1989 by Election Commission of India in collaboration with Bharat Electronics Limited and Electronics Corporation of India Limited. The Industrial designers of the EVMs were faculty members at the Industrial Design Centre, IIT Bombay. The EVMs were first used in 1982 in the by-election to North Paravur Assembly Constituency in Kerala for a limited number of polling stations. The EVMs were first time used on an experimental basis in selected constituencies of Rajasthan, Madhya Pradesh and Delhi. The EVMs were used first time in the general election (entire state) to the assembly of Goa in 1999. In 2003, all by-elections and state elections were held using EVMs, encouraged by this election commission decided to use only EVMs for Lok Sabha elections in 2004.

Design and technology

The EVM was designed by two professors of IIT Bombay, A.G. Rao and Ravi Poovaiah. An EVM consists of two units, a control unit, and the balloting unit. The two units are joined by a five-meter cable. Balloting unit facilitates voting by a voter via labeled buttons while the control unit controls the ballot units, stores voting counts and displays the results on 7 segment LED displays. The controller used in EVMs has its operating program etched permanently in silicon at the time of manufacturing by the manufacturer. No one (including the manufacturer) can change the program once the controller is manufactured. The control unit is operated by one of the polling booth officers, while the balloting unit is operated by the voter in privacy. The officer confirms the voter's identification then electronically activates the ballot unit to accept a new vote. Once the voter enters the vote, the balloting unit displays the vote to the voter, records it in its memory. A "close" command issued from the control unit by the polling booth officer registers the vote, relocks the unit to prevent multiple votes. The process is repeated when the next voter with a new voter ID arrives before the polling booth officer.

EVMs are powered by an ordinary 6 volt alkaline battery manufactured by Bharat Electronics Limited, Bangalore and Electronics Corporation of India Limited, Hyderabad. This design enables the use of EVMs throughout the country without interruptions because several parts of India do not have the power supply and/or erratic power supply. The two units cannot work without each other. After a poll closes on a particular election day, the units are separated and the control units moved and stored separately in locked and guarded premises.

Both units have numerous tamper-proof protocols. Their hardware, by design, can only be programmed once at the time of their manufacture and they cannot be reprogrammed. They do not have any wireless communication components inside, nor any internet interface and related hardware. The balloting unit has an internal real-time clock and a protocol by which it records every input-output event with a timestamp whenever they are connected to a battery pack. The designers intentionally opted for battery power, to prevent the possibility that the power cables might be used to interfere with the reliable functioning of an EVM.

An EVM can record a maximum of 3840 (now 2000) votes and can cater to a maximum of 64 candidates. There is provision for 16 candidates in a single balloting unit and up to a maximum of 4 balloting units with 64 candidate names and the respective party symbols can be connected in parallel to the control unit. If there are more than 64 candidates, the conventional ballot paper/box method of polling is deployed by the Election Commission. After a 2013 upgrade, an Indian EVM can cater to a maximum of 384 candidates plus "None Of The Above" option (NOTA).

The current electronic voting machines in India are the M3 version with VVPAT capability, the older versions being M1 and M2. They are built and encoded with once-write software (read-only masked memory) at the state-owned and high-security premises of the Bharat Electronics Limited and the Electronics Corporation of India Limited. The inventory of election EVMs is securely tracked by the Election Commission of India on a real-time basis with EVM Tracking Software (ETS). This system tracks its digital verification identity and physical presence. The M3 EVMs has embedded hardware and software that enables only a particular control unit to work with a particular voting unit issued by the Election Commission, as another layer of tamper-proofing. Additional means of tamper proofing the machines include several layers of seals. Indian EVMs are stand-alone non-networked machines.

Procedure to use 
The control unit is with the presiding officer or a polling officer and the balloting Unit is placed inside the voting compartment. The balloting unit presents the voter with blue buttons (momentary switch) horizontally labeled with corresponding party symbol and candidate names. The Control Unit, on the other hand, provides the officer-in-charge with a "Ballot" marked button to proceed to the next voter, instead of issuing a ballot paper to them. This activates the ballot unit for a single vote from the next voter in the queue. The voter has to cast his vote by once pressing the blue button on the balloting unit against the candidate and symbol of his choice.

As soon as the last voter has voted, the Polling Officer-in-charge of the Control Unit will press the 'Close' Button. Thereafter, the EVM will not accept any votes. Further, after the close of the poll, the Balloting Unit is disconnected from the Control Unit and kept separately. Votes can be recorded only through the Balloting Unit. Again the Presiding officer, at the close of the poll, will hand over to each polling agent present an account of votes recorded. At the time of counting of votes, the total will be tallied with this account and if there is any discrepancy, this will be pointed out by the Counting Agents. During the counting of votes, the results are displayed by pressing the 'Result' button. There are two safeguards to prevent the 'Result' button from being pressed before the counting of votes officially begins. (a) This button cannot be pressed till the 'Close' button is pressed by the Polling Officer-in-charge at the end of the voting process in the polling booth. (b) This button is hidden and sealed; this can be broken only at the counting center in the presence of a designated office.

Benefits
Even though the initial investment was heavy, it has since been expected to save costs of production and printing of crores of ballot papers, their transportation and storage, substantial reduction in the counting staff and the remuneration paid to them. For each national election, it is estimated that about 10,000 tonnes of the ballot paper is saved. EVMs are easier to transport compared to ballot boxes as they are lighter, more portable, and come with polypropylene carrying cases. Vote counting is also faster. In places where illiteracy is a factor, illiterate people find EVMs easier than ballot paper system. Bogus voting is greatly reduced as the vote is recorded only once. The unit can store the result in its memory before it is erased manually. The battery is required only to activate the EVMs at the time of polling and counting and as soon as the polling is over, the battery can be switched off. The shelf life of Indian EVMs is estimated at 15 years.

Limitations

A candidate can know how many people from a polling station voted for them. This is a significant issue particularly if lop-sided votes for/against a candidate are cast in individual polling stations and the winning candidate might show favoritism or hold a grudge on specific areas. The Election Commission of India has stated that the manufacturers of the EVMs have developed a Totaliser unit which can connect several balloting units and would display only the overall results from an Assembly or a Lok Sabha constituency instead of votes from individual polling stations.

Security issues
An international conference on the Indian EVMs and their tamperability was held under the chairmanship of Subramanian Swamy, President of the Janata Party and former Union Cabinet Minister for Law, Commerce, and Justice at Chennai on 13 February 2010. The conclusion was that the Election Commission of India was shirking its responsibility on the transparency in the working of the EVMs. In April 2010, an independent security analysis was released by a research team led by Hari K. Prasad, Rop Gonggrijp, and Alex Halderman.

In order to mitigate these threats, the researchers suggest moving to a voting system that provides greater transparency, such as paper ballots, precinct count optical scan, or a voter verified paper audit trail, since, in any of these systems, skeptical voters could, in principle, observe the physical counting process to gain confidence that the outcome is fair.

Manufacturers of Electronic Voting Machines, namely Electronics Corporation of India Limited, Hyderabad and Bharat Electronics Limited, Bengaluru have said that EVMs are unhackable and tamper-proof as programming for EVMs is done at a secure manufacturing facility in ECIL and BEL (where operations are logged electronically) and not with chip manufacturers. Control and ballot units in EVMs and VVPATs have an anti-tamper mechanism by which they become non-operational if it is illegally opened. EVMs are standalone machines, have no radio frequency transmission device features, operate on battery packs and cannot be reprogrammed. The Control Unit of EVMs has a real-time clock that logs every event on its right from the time it was switched on. The anti-tamper mechanism in the machine can detect even 100-millisecond variations.

On 25 July 2011, responding to a PIL (Writ Petition (Civil) No. 312 of 2011), Supreme Court of India asked EC to consider request to modify EVMs and respond within three months. The petitioner Rajendra Satyanarayan Gilda had alleged that EC has failed to take any decision despite his repeated representation. The petitioner suggested that the EVMs should be modified to give a slip printed with the symbol of the party in whose favour the voter cast his ballot.

On 17 January 2012, Delhi High Court in its ruling on Dr. Subramanian Swamy's Writ Petition (Writ Petition (Civil) No. 11879 of 2009) challenging the use of EVMs in the present form said that EVMs are not "tamper-proof". Further, it said that it is "difficult" to issue any directions to the EC in this regard. However, the court added that the EC should itself hold wider consultations with the executive, political parties and other stake holders on the matter.

Swamy appealed against Delhi High Court's refusal to order a VVPAT system in Supreme Court. On 27 September 2012, Election Commission's advocate Ashok Desai submitted to a Supreme Court bench of Justice P. Sathasivam and Justice Ranjan Gogoi that field trial for the VVPAT system is in progress and that a status report will be submitted by early January 2013. Desai said that on pressing of each vote, a paper receipt will be printed, which will be visible to the voters inside a glass but cannot be taken out of the machine. Dr. Swamy said that the new system was acceptable to him.

The Supreme Court posted the matter for further hearing to 22 January 2013 and on 8 October 2013, it delivered a verdict, that the Election Commission of India will use VVPAT.

Another similar writ petition filed by the Asom Gana Parishad is still pending before the Gauhati High Court.

2019 allegations
Syed Shuja, an expert on EVMs as claimed by India Today, has alleged that Indian EVMs can be hacked and also made serious allegations against Prime Minister Narendra Modi and the BJP-led government at the Centre, Shuja addressed a press conference in London via video conferencing and demonstrated hacking of the EVM. The cyber expert also claimed that late minister Gopinath Munde, who died in June 2014, was allegedly murdered because he was about to expose his own government over the hackings. Shuja appeared from a remote location using Skype in January 2019 for a press conference organized by the Indian Journalists’ Association and the London-based Foreign Press Association. He alleged that the EVM units can be wirelessly tampered with, and have been tampered with the help of Reliance Communications. He also made allegations of many murders and other criminal activity associated with EVMs tampering, allegations he could not substantiate nor did he present any evidence for his allegations before journalists gathered in London for the Shuja press interview.

The possibility of EVM tampering as described by Shuja have been rejected by the Election Commission of India. The Commission stated that the Indian EVMs do not contain any wireless chips and related communication components. The Election Commission reiterated that their official EVMs are manufactured in India under very strict supervisory and security conditions and there are "rigorous Standard Operating Procedures meticulously observed at all stages under the supervision of a Committee of eminent technical experts constituted way back in 2010". The commission has charged Shuja under Section 505(1)(b) of the Indian Penal Code (titled "Punishment for Statements Conducing to Public Mischief") by lodging a First Information Report against him with the Delhi Police. The Bharatiya Janata Party attributed this claim to the opposing Indian National Congress as an attempt by them to manipulate the electorate with fake news before forthcoming elections.

In January 2019, the London-based press conference organizer stated, "The Foreign Press Association strongly disassociates itself with any claims made by the speaker Syed Shuja during the #IJA event [about Indian EVMs and related matters] in London yesterday. Not one of the masked speaker’s accusations has so far been corroborated." The India Today called Shuja's allegations as "sensationalism without substance."

In October 2019, Rahul Chimanbhai Mehta, a graduate of IIT-Delhi and founder of Right to Recall Party gave an advertisement in The Indian Express news paper explaining how EVMs can be rigged. In the advertisement he also explained how VVPAT can steal votes. He claimed malicious codes can be entered in the machine to change what the EVM shows by way of results. He proposed a solution of either a colourless, transparent VVPAT machine, or no EVM at all.

On 30 March 2022, a Congress leader Shashi Tharoor tweeted that the mounting level of concerns about irregularities in the handling of EVMs requires a serious response from the Election Commission. He referred to the official confirmation of “missing EVMs” with a newspaper report.

On 8 May 2022, a Karnataka Congress leader and MLA H.K. Patil urged the Legislative Assembly Speaker Vishveshwara Hegde Kageri to investigate into the issue of 19 lakh (1.9 million) missing EVMs. A delegation led by Patil demanded the probe to be carried out by a Special Committee headed by a Judge of the Supreme Court. Patil expressed his concern over the inordinate delays in taking up petitions by the courts regarding the use of EVMs.

Voter-verifiable paper audit trail

On 8 October 2010 Election Commission appointed an expert technical committee headed by Prof. P. V. Indiresan (former Director of IIT-M) when at an all-party meeting majority of political parties backed the proposal to have a VVPAT in EVMs to counter the charges of tampering. The committee was tasked to examine the possibility of introduction of a paper trail so that voters can get a printout that will show symbol of the party to which the vote was cast. After studying the issue, the committee recommended introduction of VVPAT system.

On 21 June 2011, Election Commission accepted Indiresan committee's recommendations and decided to conduct field trials of the system. On 26 July 2011, field trials of the VVPAT system were conducted at Ladakh in Jammu and Kashmir, Thiruvananthapuram in Kerala, Cherrapunjee in Meghalaya, East Delhi in Delhi and Jaisalmer in Rajasthan.

The Election Commission on 19 January 2012 agreed to add a "paper trail" of the vote cast. The upgrade of EVMs that followed modified the EVM software and a printer was attached to the machine. With the VVPAT system, when a vote is cast, it is recorded in its memory and simultaneously a serial number and vote data is printed out. This states Anil Kumar, the managing director of the state-owned EVM manufacturer Bharat Electronic Limited, ensures more confidence in the voting results. The printouts, Kumar said, "are used later to cross-check the voting data stored in the EVMs".

Voter-verifiable paper audit trail was first used in an election in India in September 2013 in Noksen in Nagaland. The voter-verifiable paper audit trail (VVPAT) system was introduced in 8 of 543 parliamentary constituencies in 2014. VVPAT was implemented in the 2014 elections at Lucknow, Gandhinagar, Bangalore South, Chennai Central, Jadavpur, Raipur, Patna Sahib and Mizoram constituencies.

On 8 October 2013, Supreme Court of India delivered its verdict on Subramanian Swamy's PIL, that Election Commission of India will use VVPAT along with EVMs in a phased manner. In June 2018, Election Commission of India decided that all VVPATs will have a built-in-hood to protect the printer and other devices from excess light and heat.

Exports
Nepal, Bhutan, Namibia and Kenya have purchased India-manufactured EVMs. Fiji was expected to use Indian EVMs in its elections in 2014. In 2013, the Election Commission of Namibia acquired 1700 control units and 3500 ballot units from India's Bharat Electronics Limited; these units will be used in the regional and presidential elections in 2014. Several other Asian and African countries are reportedly interested in using them as well.

See also 
 Electoral fraud
 None of the above
 Postal voting in India
 Risk-limiting audit
 Voting machine

Further reading 
  Delhi High Court judgement saying EVMs are not foolproof.

References

External links 
 
 Security Analysis of India's Electronic Voting Machines, Scott Wolchok et al, A paper presented at the 17th ACM Conference on Computer and Communications Security Conference

Science and technology in India
Elections in India
Electronic voting by country